Sangeetha Kalasarathy, is the title awarded yearly by Parthasarathy Swami Sabha for Carnatic Music expert. It carries a shawl, a citation, a medallion with a cash purse of Rs. 5,000.

Recipients
 Balamuralikrishna in 102nd annual music festival 
 Aruna Sayeeram in 105th annual music festival 
 Bombay Jayashri in 107th annual music festival
 Neyveli Santhanagopalan in 108th annual music festival 
 Nithyasree Mahadevan in 110th annual music festival 
 S. Sowmya in 111th annual music festival 
 P. Unnikrishnan in 112th annual music festival

References

Indian music awards
Carnatic music
India music-related lists
Year of establishment missing
Tamil Nadu awards